Fifi D'Orsay (born Marie-Rose Angelina Yvonne Lussier; April 16, 1904 – December 2, 1983) was a Canadian-American actress and singer.

Early life
Fifi D'Orsay was born Yvonne Lussier in Montreal, Quebec, Canada, to a father who was a postal clerk. The D'Orsays were a large family, with Fifi having 11 siblings. She was educated at the Academy of the Sacred Heart in Montreal before graduating and finding work as a secretary.

Biography
As a young stenographer, she wished to become an actress, and moved to New York City. Once there she found work with the Greenwich Village Follies, after an audition in which she sang "Yes! We Have No Bananas" in French. When asked where she was from, she told the director she was from Paris, France, and that she had worked in the Folies Bergère. The impressed director hired her, billing her as "Mademoiselle Fifi".

While working in the Follies, she became involved with Ed Gallagher, a veteran actor who was half of the successful Broadway comedy team of Gallagher and Shean. Gallagher and D'Orsay put together a vaudeville act, and he coached her in the art of show business. After touring in vaudeville, she headed to Hollywood and adopted the surname "D'Orsay" (after a favorite perfume). Soon after she began working in films, often cast as the "naughty French girl" from "gay Paris".

She became a U.S. citizen in 1936, just as her career as a film star came to a sharp halt when she walked out on her contract at Fox Studios and was blacklisted.

While never becoming a major top-billing name, she found steady work, and appeared with such stalwarts as Bing Crosby and Buster Crabbe. For years she worked in both film and vaudeville; pacing her appearances in film with continued performances in vaudeville. When age put an end to the glamour roles, she took jobs in television; including 2 appearances each on ABC's Adventures in Paradise (as a mother superior in the episode "Castaways"), and the CBS legal drama Perry Mason (in the episode "The Case of the Grumbling Grandfather" and in the episode “The Case of the Bountiful Beauty”)- as well appearing in the CBS sitcom Pete and Gladys. She was a contestant on Groucho Marx's You Bet Your Life (Feb. 23, 1956), and at the age of sixty-seven she bookended her career with a return to the Broadway stage in the Tony Award-winning musical, Follies.

Personal life
D'Orsay married twice. Her first husband was Earl Hill (also billed as "Maury Hill" & "Morgan Hill"), the son of a Chicago manufacturer. She divorced Hill in 1939 and married Peter LaRicos in 1947, a restaurateur and agent.

D'Orsay died from cancer at the age of seventy-nine on December 2, 1983, at the Motion Picture & Television Country House and Hospital in Woodland Hills, Los Angeles. She was interred in the Forest Lawn Memorial Park Cemetery in Glendale, California.

Legacy
D'Orsay was credited as the girl who made the phrase "Ooh La La" widely known.

Partial filmography

 They Had to See Paris (1929) - Fifi
 Hot for Paris (1929) - Fifi Dupre
 On the Level (1930) - Miimi
 Women Everywhere (1930) - Lili La Fleur
 Those Three French Girls (1930) - Charmaine 
 Mr. Lemon of Orange (1931) - Julie La Rue
 The Stolen Jools (1931, Short) - Fifi D'Orsay
 Women of All Nations (1931) - Fifi (uncredited)
 Young as You Feel (1931) - Fleurette
 The Girl from Calgary (1932) - Fifi Follette
 They Just Had to Get Married (1932) - Marie
 The Life of Jimmy Dolan (1933) - Budgie
 Going Hollywood (1933) - Lili Yvonne
 Wonder Bar (1934) - Mitzi
 The Merry Widow (1934) - Marcelle
 Three Legionnaires (1937) - Olga
 Submarine Base (1943) - Maria Styx
 Nabonga (1944) - Marie
 Delinquent Daughters (1944) - Mimi
 Dixie Jamboree (1945) - Yvette
 The Gangster (1947) - Mrs. Ostroleng
 Four Horsemen of the Apocalypse (1962) - French Prisoner (uncredited)
 Wild and Wonderful (1964) - Simone
 What a Way to Go! (1964) - Baroness
 The Art of Love (1965) - Fanny
 Assignment to Kill (1968) - Mrs. Hennie

See also

 Other Canadian pioneers in early Hollywood

References

External links

 
 
 

1904 births
1983 deaths
Actresses from Montreal
American film actresses
Canadian film actresses
Vaudeville performers
American people of French-Canadian descent
Canadian emigrants to the United States
Deaths from cancer in California
20th-century American actresses
Actresses from California
Burials at Forest Lawn Memorial Park (Glendale)